The 2022 Melbourne Storm season was the 25th in the club's history, competing in the 2022 NRL season. The team was coached by Craig Bellamy, coaching the club for his 20th consecutive season and for the second straight season, Melbourne had co-captains with Jesse Bromwich (second season), and Christian Welch (first season) sharing the duties, following the departure of Dale Finucane.

Melbourne qualified for the 2022 NRL finals series in fifth place, but were defeated by the Canberra Raiders 28–20 at AAMI Park to be eliminated in week one of the finals. 

Club chairperson Matt Tripp summed up the season: "it’s not our style to bow out of the finals in week one without a yelp... no one is making excuses about injuries but if you sit back and look at how many we had, there were excuses in key positions that cost us a few games throughout the home and away season, which made it tough in the finals."

Season summary
 Preseason – New recruits from the 2021–22  season took part in Melbourne Storm IDQ camp for pre season before New Years. Josh King was awarded the IDQ Iron bar with special recognition to William Warbrick.
 3 February – Ending a months-long absence, Nelson Asofa-Solomona returns to training after he "had provided all necessary information and certification to comply with the requirements of the Victorian and Queensland Governments to allow him to return for training and to play". It had been reported that Asofa-Solomona was in danger of missing the 2022 season after he missed a December 2021 deadline to prove his vaccination status against COVID-19.
 19 February – Playing in Victoria for the first time since April 2021, Melbourne played their first NRL trial game of the year, going down 18–24 in front of a crowd of 7,000 at Casey Fields. An inexperienced squad, led by George Jennings played to raise funds for those impacted by the 2022 Hunga Tonga–Hunga Ha'apai eruption and tsunami.
 27 February – In the final hit out before the start of the regular season, Melbourne played their first ever game in Ballarat, defeating Newcastle Knights 24–10 at Mars Stadium. Leading 6–4 at half time, tries to rookie Tyran Wishart, Felise Kaufusi, and new recruit Jayden Nikorima sealing the victory. Injuries to Cooper Johns and Xavier Coates the main concerns ahead of Round 1, exacerbated by a number of players who will miss the game through suspensions.
 2 March –  forward Christian Welch is appointed a club co-captain for the first time, joining incumbent Jesse Bromwich in sharing the duties.
 Round 1 – Melbourne maintain their winning streak in round 1 games, dating back to 2001, defeating Wests Tigers 26–16 for the club's first win at CommBank Stadium. The win was remarkable due to the club missing key players through suspension and also three players sustaining serious injuries during the match, in addition, five players made their club or NRL debut, the most in a single game for Melbourne since round 14 of the 2000 season. The win was coach Craig Bellamy's 350th of his coaching career.
 Round 2 – Returning to AAMI Park for the first time in 321 days, and commemorating coach Craig Bellamy's 500th game, Melbourne extended their winning record against South Sydney Rabbitohs in Victoria to 18–0 with a 15–14 win in Golden point. Ryan Papenhuyzen kicking the winning field goal in the 84th minute.
 Round 3 – In a second successive Golden point game, Melbourne lose 28–24 against Parramatta Eels for the third straight game, with Ray Stone scoring the winning try in extra time after the ball bounced off the upright from a Mitchell Moses field goal attempt.
 1 April – Melbourne extend the contracts of key players Harry Grant, Jahrome Hughes and Xavier Coates; re-signing the trio on long-term contracts to stay with the club.
 Round 4 – Ryan Papenhuyzen scores a career-high 28 points (four tries, six goals), as Melbourne keep Canterbury-Bankstown Bulldogs scoreless for the second time in club history, winning 44–0.
 Round 6 – With Jesse and Kenny Bromwich both unavailable, Jahrome Hughes becomes the 26th club captain, as Melbourne defeat Cronulla-Sutherland Sharks 34-18.
 Round 7 – ANZAC Day, Storm score an equal club record 70 points, defeating New Zealand Warriors by 60 in one of the largest wins in the club's history, retaining the Michael Moore Trophy. Xavier Coates scores four tries during the game, while Ryan Papenhuyzen is awarded the Spirit of ANZAC Medal.
 4 May – Following assault charges against him being dismissed in Brisbane Magistrates' Court, Tui Kamikamica is handed a nine-match suspension, together with a $10,000 fine by the NRL for "bringing the game into disrepute". The suspension was retrospectively applied to cover the period Kamikamica was initially stood down by the club under the NRL's no-fault stand down policy.
 Round 9 – Melbourne defeat St. George Illawarra Dragons 42-6 in Nelson Asofa Solomona's 150th game and Kenneath Bromwich's 200th game. The win put the Storm on top of the NRL ladder for the first time in 2022 with a superior points differential. In addition, following the game Melbourne had accrued 325 points over the first nine rounds, eclipsing the Roosters' 1935 record.
 10 May – It is confirmed that  Ryan Papenhuyzen (hamstring and knee – 4–6 weeks) and  Reimis Smith (ruptured pec – 10–12 weeks) will be missing due to injuries sustained in the win against St. George Illawarra. Smith would later re-injure his pectoral muscle after aggravating the injury at training.
 18 May – Melbourne confirm that head coach Craig Bellamy will continue in the role in 2023, his 21st season as coach in Melbourne. Bellamy had signed a new five-year contract with the club in 2022 that allows him to decide each year whether he will continue in the head coach role for the following season or transition into a coaching director role.
 8 June – Young Tonumaipea rejoins the club on a train and trial contract, following the end of the 2022 Super Rugby Pacific season where he had been playing with the Melbourne Rebels. Tonumaipea last played for Storm in 2018.
 Round 14 – Grant Anderson makes his NRL debut, scoring two tries at the Sydney Cricket Ground in Melbourne's 26-16 victory over Sydney Roosters. Anderson who had been playing for Storm feeder club Sunshine Coast Falcons moved to Melbourne on a short-term contract and was called into the team due to an injury to Xavier Coates in Origin I. Anderson was the first debutant to score two tries at the SCG since Wallaby convert Phil Smith for South Sydney against St George in 1971.
 13 June – PNG international  Justin Olam renews his contract with Melbourne, with his new deal committing him until the end of the 2026 season.
 12 July – Brandon Smith is suspended by the NRL Judiciary for three matches for contrary conduct in the Round 17 match against Cronulla. Smith was sent to the sin bin in the 60th minute by referee Adam Gee for calling him a "cheating bastard." The judiciary panel consisting of Tony Puletua and former referee Paul Simpkins taking the view that Smith's comments questioned the referee's honesty and integrity, handing down a penalty that reflected that the conduct was unacceptable and that a three match suspension acted as an appropriate deterrent.
 15 July – The club announces that they have set a new NRL membership record, with 37,237 members (including more than 10,000 new members in 2022), breaking the record set by the Brisbane Broncos in 2018.
 Round 18 – Melbourne lose their third straight game the first time since 2015, as the Canberra Raiders won their fifth straight game at AAMI Park 20–16.  Ryan Papenhuyzen suffered a fractured patella to rule him out for the season, he became the fourth player to suffer a season ending injury thus far. In a pre-match ceremony, the club honoured retired played Cameron Smith renaming the Eastern Stand at AAMI Park the "Cameron Smith Stand."
 29 July – Wests Tigers er David Nofoaluma joins Melbourne for the rest of the season on loan. Nofoaluma was brought in due to the club's injury toll.
The match sees Jesse and Kenny Bromwich become the first pair of brothers to play over 500 NRL games combined at one club.
 8 August – The club re-signs Tui Kamikamica and Tepai Moeroa to new contracts to the end of the 2023 season, and signs Warriors er Eliesa Katoa on a two-year deal from 2023.
 Round 22 – Melbourne hold defending premiers Penrith Panthers scoreless to win 16-0 at BlueBet Stadium. Melbourne had been the last team to hold Penrith scoreless at the same venue in 2015.
 24 August – A flurry of re-signing news as the club extends the contracts of George Jennings, Grant Anderson, Jayden Nikorima, Dean Ieremia (2023); and Marion Seve (2024).
 Round 25 – Despite consecutive losses, Melbourne qualified for the 2022 NRL finals series finishing the season in fifth place on the NRL ladder. It was Melbourne's 12th consecutive finals qualification, but the first outside of the top four since 2014.
 Elimination Final – Melbourne are eliminated from the finals following a 28–20 defeat by the Canberra Raiders. After trailing 16–8 at half time, Melbourne rallied in the second half to take the lead, but were overrun as Canberra notched their fifth straight victory at AAMI Park.
 27 September – Cameron Munster is awarded the Cameron Smith Player of the Year Award at the Melbourne Storm awards night. It was Munster's second Player of the Year Award win after previously being awarded the accolade in 2018. During the ceremony, Melbourne Storm CEO Justin Rodski announced that the club had signed up a NRL-record 41,108 members in 2022, and that two home games during the 2023 season would be held at Marvel Stadium due to AAMI Park's unavailability period for the 2023 FIFA Women's World Cup.
 5 October – The club re-signs forwards Alec MacDonald, Trent Loiero (2025); and Tom Eisenhuth (2023). MacDonald joining the club's top 30 squad for the first time after playing 12 games in his debut season.
 6 October – After months of speculation that he would leave Melbourne at the end of the 2023 NRL season, Cameron Munster re-signs with the club until the end of the 2027 NRL season.

Milestone games

Fixtures

Pre-season 

Source:

Regular season
Source:
(GP) - Golden Point extra time
(pen) - Penalty try

Finals 
Source:

Ladder

Coaching staff
Craig Bellamy – Head Coach
Stephen Kearney – Assistant Coach
 Marc Brentnall – Assistant Coach
 Aaron Bellamy – Development Coach
 Ryan Hinchcliffe – Development Coach
 Frank Ponissi – Football Director
Ryan Hoffman – Football Administration Coordinator
 Billy Slater – Specialist Coach (Part-time)
 Cooper Cronk - Halves Coach (Part-time)
 Matt Duffie - Pathways Coach
 Tim Glasby - Recruitment Officer and Pathways Manager
 Adam Woolnough – Victoria Thunderbolts (Under-21s) Head Coach
 Jon Buchanan – Easts Tigers Feeder Club Coach
 Brad Henderson – Sunshine Coast Falcons Feeder Club Coach

2022 squad
List current as of 1 August 2022

Player movements
Source:

Losses
 Josh Addo-Carr to Canterbury-Bankstown Bulldogs
 Daniel Atkinson to Released 
 Aaron Booth to Gold Coast Titans
 Dale Finucane to Cronulla Sharks
 Nicho Hynes to Cronulla Sharks
 Ryley Jacks to Featherstone Rovers
 Max King to Canterbury-Bankstown Bulldogs
 Brenko Lee to Brisbane Broncos 
 Isaac Lumelume to Canterbury-Bankstown Bulldogs
 Aaron Pene to New Zealand Warriors
 Darryn Schonig to Released 
 Tyson Smoothy to Released 
 Judda Turahui to Canterbury-Bankstown Bulldogs

Gains
 Grant Anderson from Northern Pride
 Xavier Coates from Brisbane Broncos
 Bronson Garlick   from  Newtown Jets
 Josh King  from Newcastle Knights
 Alec MacDonald from Wynnum Manly Seagulls
 Nick Meaney from Canterbury-Bankstown Bulldogs
 Jayden Nikorima from  Redcliffe Dolphins
 David Nofoaluma from Wests Tigers (midseason loan)
 William Warbrick from New Zealand national rugby sevens team
 Young Tonumaipea from Melbourne Rebels

Representative honours
This table lists all players who have played a representative match in 2022.

Statistics 

This table contains playing statistics for all Melbourne Storm players to have played in the 2022 NRL season.

Statistics sources:

Scorers

Most points in a game: 28 points 
 Round 4 – Ryan Papenhuyzen (4 Tries, 6 Goals) vs Canterbury-Bankstown Bulldogs

Most tries in a game: 4 
 Round 4 – Ryan Papenhuyzen vs Canterbury-Bankstown Bulldogs
 Round 7 – Xavier Coates vs New Zealand Warriors

Winning games

Highest score in a winning game: 70 points
 Round 7 vs New Zealand Warriors

Lowest score in a winning game: 15 points
 Round 2 vs South Sydney Rabbitohs

Greatest winning margin: 60 points
 Round 7 vs New Zealand Warriors

Greatest number of games won consecutively: 6 
 Round 4 – Round 9

Losing games

Highest score in a losing game: 30 points
 Round 16 vs Manly Sea Eagles

Lowest score in a losing game: 6 points
 Round 10 vs Penrith Panthers
 Round 11 vs North Queensland Cowboys
 Round 17 vs Cronulla-Sutherland Sharks

Greatest losing margin: 30 points
 Round 11 vs North Queensland Cowboys

Greatest number of games lost consecutively: 4
 Round 16 – Round 19

Jerseys
In December 2020, Melbourne Storm announced a new 5 year sponsorship and apparel partnership agreement with British sportswear company, Castore. They will continue produce supporter wear and jersey for season 2022, the design announced on 14 January 2021 will be the same for 2022. Throughout the 2022 season, the club has used six different jerseys.

Home

The home jersey features a classic V shape on the chest with a yellow outline. Among the special features Castore has incorporated in the new jersey is a lightning bolt design on the sleeve and the inclusion of a Big V logo on the inner collar as a continuation of the Our Home, Victoria acknowledgment which began during the 2020 season to honor Storm's home state.

Away

The away jersey, worn when the home jersey creates a clash with the opposition, is a similar design to the home jersey but in majority white; worn with navy blue shorts and either navy blue or white socks with navy blue cuffs

ANZAC Day

An alternate jersey, showcasing elements of the club's ANZAC Day game day ceremony was worn against New Zealand Warriors in round 7. The jersey was rendered in an almost royal blue and featured elements including the silhouette of the Kokoda Track memorial located at the 1,000 Steps trail in the Dandenong Ranges National Park.

Indigenous Round

Designed by indigenous artist Coree Thorpe, of the Yorta Yorta, Gunnai, Gunditjmara and Wurundjeri nations, the 2022 Melbourne jersey worn during Indigenous Round was inspired by the rainbow serpent with yellow and orange lines across a majority purple base. The design also features a diamond pattern "symbolising the men and women who come together to form Melbourne Storm."

Alternate

On 30 June 2021 Castore announced a fan competition to design a jersey for the 2022 season which would become an alternate to the main home and away jerseys. The winning design was revealed on 22 May 2022 with the jersey worn in round 15. Designed by club season ticket holder Josh Flood, the mostly navy blue jersey features electric yellow lightning bolts.

Heritage

Revealed on 6 July 2022 to celebrate the 10-year anniversary of the 2012 premiership victory, Melbourne released a jersey design based on the home jersey worn during the 2012 season. The jersey was worn in round 18 against Canberra during the club's "Old Boys Weekend".

Awards

Trophy Cabinet
Michael Moore Trophy (Rounds 7 & 20)

Melbourne Storm Awards Night
Held at Ciel the Venue, Melbourne on Tuesday, 27 September.
 Cameron Smith Player of the Year: Cameron Munster
 Billy Slater Rookie of the Year: Tyran Wishart
 Melbourne Storm Members' Player of Year: Cameron Munster
 Melbourne Storm Most Improved: Marion Seve
 Melbourne Storm Best Back: Ryan Papenhuyzen & Nick Meaney
 Melbourne Storm Best Forward: Harry Grant
 Cooper Cronk Feeder Club Player of the Year: Sua Fa'alogo
 Mick Moore Club Person of the Year: Daniel Di Pasqua 
 Chairman’s Award: Aaron Rizzatti
 Darren Bell Medal (U21s Player of the Year): Cole Geyer
 Greg Brentnall Young Achievers Award: Jared Nauma 
 Best Try: Ryan Papenhuyzen, Round 7 vs New Zealand Warriors
 Life Member Inductees: Kenny Bromwich, Gerry Ryan, Danielle Smith, Ross Patison

Dally M Awards Night 
Held at Randwick Racecourse, Sydney on Wednesday, 28 September.
 Dally M Five-Eighth of the Year: Cameron Munster

Rugby League Players’ Association Awards
RLPA Centre of the Year: Justin Olam
RLPA Five-Eighth of the Year: Cameron Munster
 2022 Academic Team of the Year: Tom Eisenhuth

Additional awards
 I Don't Quit Iron Bar: Josh King
 Spirit of Anzac Medal: Ryan Papenhuyzen
 Under 19s State of Origin Player of the Match: Jonah Pezet
 Ken Stephen Medal nominee & NRL Community Team of the Year: Christian Welch
 2021 Rugby League World Cup Team of the Tournament: Harry Grant

Notes

References

Melbourne Storm seasons
Melbourne Storm season